Mosque of Omar, Masjid Umar, Masjid-e-Umar, Al-Omari Mosque or Mosque of Omar ibn al-Khattab is a name given to many mosques, usually referring to Omar, a companion of Muhammad and Caliph (579-644) recognized by Sunni Muslims in the succession to Muhammad. Masjid is the Arabic word for a place of worship, commonly translated as mosque in English.

Notable examples
Notable ones include (alphabetically, by city):
Al-Omari Grand Mosque, Beirut, Lebanon
Mosque of Omar (Bethlehem), West Bank, Palestine
Al-Omari Mosque (Bosra), Syria
Al-Omari Mosque (Daraa), Syria. The Daraa mosque was allegedly built during the rule of Caliph Omar ibn al-Khattab in the seventh century. Its minaret collapsed after being shelled in 2013. 
Al Farooq Omar Bin Al Khattab Mosque, Dubai, UAE
Omar ibn al-Khattab Mosque, Dumat al-Jandal, Saudi Arabia
Mesquita Omar Ibn Al-Khatab, Foz do Iguaçu, Brazil
Great Mosque of Gaza also known as al-Omari Mosque, Gaza City, Palestine
Omari Mosque (Jabalia), Gaza Strip, Palestine (see Jabalia#History)
Mosque of Omar (Jerusalem)
 Musalla of Omar (Mosque of Omar), Jerusalem: the east wing of the al-Aqsa Mosque (al-Qibli Mosque)
Dome of the Rock, Jerusalem: in the past also known in the West as Mosque of Omar
Sidna Omar mosque, Jerusalem
Umar Mosque (Leicester), UK
Mosque of Omar Ibn Al-Khattab, Maicao, Colombia

Others

United Kingdom
 Birmingham
 Bradford
 Cardiff
 Darlaston
 Gloucester
 Huddersfield
 London, Barking district of East London, where convicted terrorist plotter Umar Haque attended 
 Nottingham
 Sheffield

United States
 Baltimore
 Brownstown Charter Township, Michigan
 Columbus, Ohio
 Kingston, New York
 Washington, D.C.
 Paterson, New Jersey

Latin America & the Caribbean
 Omar Mosque, San José, Costa Rica
 Omar Bin Al-Khattab Mosque, Willemstad, Curaçao

References

Lists of mosques